Polyscias maraisiana is a species of plant in the family Araliaceae, formerly named Gastonia mauritiana.

It is endemic to Mauritius, where it was formerly common on forest verges and also in coastal areas. It was formerly grown as an ornamental in Europe, partly on account of its strikingly heteroblastic leaves, however it is rarely found in international cultivation now. It is however beginning to be cultivated in its native country, as an ornamental landscaping plant - for gardens and public areas. It is named for the botanist Wessel Marais.

It is one of several Polyscias species which are endemic to Mauritius, including Polyscias dichroostachya (distinctive flower-spike and large, square leaf-segments), Polyscias neraudiana (red flowers on spike, and smaller, longer leaf-segments), Polyscias gracilis, and Polyscias paniculata.

References

maraisiana
Endemic flora of Mauritius
Taxonomy articles created by Polbot
Taxobox binomials not recognized by IUCN